Paolo Maria Paciaudi (1710 – 1785) was an Italian Theatine priest, antiquarian, and historian.

Biography
He born at Turin in 1710. He studied at Bologna, became professor of philosophy at Genoa, and in 1761 settled at Parma as librarian to the grand-duke, who also appointed him his antiquary and director of some public works; besides which he was historiographer of the Order of Malta. He died in 1785. The cleric Ireneo Affò replaced him as librarian in Parma.

Main works 
De sacris christianorum balneis (1750, 4to);
De cultu S. Joannis Baptistæ antiquitates Christianæ (1754, 4to), a masterpiece full of religious minutiae;
De athletarum κυβιστήσει in palæstra Græcorum commentarius (1756, 4to);
Monumenta Peloponnesiaca (1761, 2 vols. 4to);
Memoirs of the Grand Masters of the Order of St John of Jerusalem (1780, 3 vols. 4to);
Lettres au comte de Caylus (1802, 8vo).

Source 
  The entry cites:
Fabroni, Vitæ Italorum, vol. 14 s.v.;
Leneys, Life of Paciaudi prefixed to his Letters to M. de Caylus;
Tipaldo, Biog. degli Italiani illustri, vol. 10, s.v.

External links

1710 births
1785 deaths
Clergy from Turin
Italian librarians
Writers from Turin
18th-century Italian writers
18th-century Italian male writers
18th-century Italian historians